Dennis "Bo" Biteman (born October 23, 1978) is an American politician and a Republican member of the Wyoming Senate representing District 21 since January 7, 2019. He previously served in the Wyoming House of Representatives representing District 51 from 2017 to 2019.

Elections

2016
Biteman challenged incumbent state Senate Majority Leader Rosie Berger in the Republican primary and defeated Berger with 56% of the vote. Biteman defeated Democrat Hollis Hackman in the general election with 69% of the vote.

Political Positions
Biteman is a staunch conservative. He supports restrictions on abortion; as in February 2020 he introduced a fetal heart bill to regulate abortion. He opposes instituting a state income tax in Wyoming and supports lowering taxes on mineral extraction (which contribute the majority of Wyoming's tax revenue). Biteman has supported the debunked claims of election fraud alleged by Donald Trump in the aftermath of the 2020 United States presidential election and is proponent of the Stop the Steal movement.

References

External links
Official page at the Wyoming Legislature
Profile from Ballotpedia

Living people
Republican Party members of the Wyoming House of Representatives
Republican Party Wyoming state senators
1978 births
Grand Valley State University alumni
21st-century American politicians